In the Library with the Lead Pipe is a peer-reviewed academic journal that covers topics about libraries.

Abstracting and indexing
The journal is abstracted and indexed in Library & Information Science Source and EBSCO databases.

History 
In the Library with the Lead Pipe was founded as a blog and then developed into a library practice journal. In 2014 the journal created "Library Pipeline", "a non-profit for developing library projects and librarians’ professional development".

A survey of 67 university librarians and archivists showed that only 5% were regular readers of In the Library with the Lead Pipe. The Library and Information Technology Association incorporated involvement with the journal into its 2010 strategic plan. A 2015 editorial in College & Research Libraries asserted that the journal "pushes forward a critical dimension, blurring the lines between blog and peer-reviewed journal."

References

External links

Library science journals
Creative Commons Attribution-licensed journals
English-language journals
Publications established in 2008
Continuous journals